Malinga Amarasinghe (born 19 October 1997) is a Sri Lankan cricketer. He made his List A debut for Matara District in the 2016–17 Districts One Day Tournament on 22 March 2017. He made his first-class debut for Nondescripts Cricket Club in the 2017–18 Premier League Tournament on 8 December 2017. He made his Twenty20 debut for Nondescripts Cricket Club in the 2018–19 SLC Twenty20 Tournament on 18 February 2019. Malinga was educated at Nalanda College, Colombo.

References

External links
 

1997 births
Living people
Sri Lankan cricketers
Matara District cricketers
Nondescripts Cricket Club cricketers
Cricketers from Colombo
Alumni of Nalanda College, Colombo